The number of animated series with LGBTQ characters increased from the previous decade. From 2000 to 2004, such characters appeared prominently in Queer Duck, Drawn Together, and The Venture Bros. all of which were Western animations. However, they appeared more frequently in anime series such as Gravitation, Kino's Journey, Kannazuki no Miko, and My-HiME. The shows airing during this period set the stage for those to come in 2005 to 2009, the latter part of the decade.

This list only includes recurring characters, otherwise known as supporting characters, which appear frequently from time to time during the series' run, often playing major roles in more than one episode, and those in the main cast are listed below. LGBTQ characters which are guest stars or one-off characters are listed on the pages focusing exclusively on gay (in animation and anime), lesbian (in animation and anime), bisexual (in animation and anime), trans, pansexual, asexual, non-binary, and intersex characters.

For a further understanding of how these LGBTQ characters fit into the overall history of animation, see the History of LGBTQ characters in animated series: 2000s page.

The entries on this page are organized alphanumerically by duration dates and then alphabetically by the first letter of a specific series.

2000

2001

2002

2003

2004

See also

 List of yuri anime and manga
 List of LGBT-related films by year
 List of animated films with LGBT characters

Notes

References

Citations

Sources
 

2000s animated television series
2000s-related lists
Animated
Lists of animated series
 
2000 in LGBT history
2001 in LGBT history
2002 in LGBT history
2003 in LGBT history
2004 in LGBT history
2000 in television
2001 in television
2002 in television
2003 in television
2004 in television